Manfred Pranger (born 25 January 1978) is an Austrian former alpine skier.

He won the gold medal in Slalom at the 2009 Alpine Skiing World Championship in Val d'Isère. He also won three Slalom races in the Alpine World Cup.

Pranger announced his retirement from competition in May 2014 after not being selected for the Austrian squad for the 2014 Winter Olympics.

World cup podiums
 3 wins – (3 Slalom)
 13 podiums – (13 Slalom)

Season standings

References 

1978 births
Living people
Austrian male alpine skiers
Olympic alpine skiers of Austria
Alpine skiers at the 2002 Winter Olympics
Alpine skiers at the 2010 Winter Olympics
People from Hall in Tirol
Sportspeople from Tyrol (state)
20th-century Austrian people